

455001–455100 

|-bgcolor=#f2f2f2
| colspan=4 align=center | 
|}

455101–455200 

|-bgcolor=#f2f2f2
| colspan=4 align=center | 
|}

455201–455300 

|-bgcolor=#f2f2f2
| colspan=4 align=center | 
|}

455301–455400 

|-bgcolor=#f2f2f2
| colspan=4 align=center | 
|}

455401–455500 

|-bgcolor=#f2f2f2
| colspan=4 align=center | 
|}

455501–455600 

|-bgcolor=#f2f2f2
| colspan=4 align=center | 
|}

455601–455700 

|-bgcolor=#f2f2f2
| colspan=4 align=center | 
|}

455701–455800 

|-id=739
| 455739 Isabelita ||  || Isabel Izquierdo Lacruz (born 1988), the niece of Spanish discoverer Juan Lacruz || 
|}

455801–455900 

|-bgcolor=#f2f2f2
| colspan=4 align=center | 
|}

455901–456000 

|-bgcolor=#f2f2f2
| colspan=4 align=center | 
|}

References 

455001-456000